The EKV Mosfet model is a mathematical model of metal-oxide semiconductor field-effect transistors (MOSFET) which is intended for circuit simulation and analog circuit design. It was developed by Christian C. Enz, François Krummenacher and Eric A. Vittoz (hence the initials EKV) around 1995 based in part on work they had done in the 1980s. Unlike simpler models like the Quadratic Model, the EKV Model is accurate even when the MOSFET is operating in the subthreshold region (e.g. when Vbulk=Vsource then the MOSFET is subthreshold when Vgate-source < VThreshold). In addition, it models many of the specialized effects seen in submicrometre CMOS IC design.

See also

 Transistor models
 MOSFET
 Ngspice
 SPICE

References

External links
Web Page of Christian Enz 
Web Page of François Krummenacher 
About Eric Vittoz 
Main Web Page for the EKV Model 

Transistor modeling
Electronic engineering

it:MOSFET#Modello EKV